Taj al-Dawla Ziyar was the Baduspanid ruler (ustandar) of Rustamdar from 1325 to 1333. He succeeded to the throne after instigating the murder of his predecessor and brother Nasir al-Din Shahriyar through his son Iskandar.

He defeated his brother Izz al-Dawla, who opposed him and had sought support from the Mongol Ilkhanate. He died in 1333 in Kavir, and was succeeded by his son Jalal al-Dawla Iskandar.

References

Sources 
 

14th-century Baduspanid rulers
1333 deaths
Year of birth unknown